The 1948-49 Scottish Division C was won by Forfar Athletic who were promoted to Division B. Edinburgh City finished bottom. It was the third and final season of the short-lived single Scottish Division C and featured seven reserve teams.

Table

Future
The competition was restructured for the 1949–50 season when the number of reserve teams was significantly expanded and the Division divided into two sections, the South-East (soon renamed the North-East) and South-West. Promotion became rarer as the reserve sides of the bigger clubs such as Rangers and Aberdeen came to dominate; Brechin City's victory in the North-East section in the 1953–54 season was the sole promotion managed in the new format before its final season. The competition completed its final season in 1954–55 when Aberdeen II won the North-East section and Partick Thistle II the South-West; three non-reserve sides, Montrose, East Stirlingshire and Berwick Rangers remained in the North-East section with two, Dumbarton and Stranraer in the South-West. All five were admitted to full membership of the Scottish Football League; the reserve teams were placed into a separate Scottish (Reserve) League.

References

Scottish Division Three seasons
3
Scot